Gekko (Gekko) reevesii 
| synonyms_ref = 
}}

Reeves's tokay gecko (Gekko reevesii) is a species of lizard in the family Gekkonidae. The species is endemic to Asia.

Etymology
The specific name, reevesii, is in honor of English naturalist John Reeves.

Geographic range
G. reevesii is indigenous to China and northwestern Vietnam.

References

Further reading
Gray JE (1831). "A Synopsis of the Species of the Class Reptilia". In: Griffith E, Pidgeon E (1831). The Animal Kingdom arranged in Conformity with its Organization by the Baron Cuvier, Member of the Institute of France, &c. &c. &c., with additional Descriptions of all the Species hitherto named, and of many not before noticed, Volume the Ninth. London: Whittaker, Treacher and Co. 481 pp. + supplement, 110 pp. (Gecko reevesii, new species, p. 48 of supplement).
Mertens R (1955). "Über eine eigenartige Rasse des Tokehs (Gekko gecko) aus Ost-Pakistan ". Senckenbergiana Biologica 36: 21–24. (Gekko reevesii considered a synonym of Gekko gecko). (in German).
Rösler H, Bauer AM, Heinicke MP, Greenbaum E, Jackman T, Nguyen TQ, Ziegler T (2011). "Phylogeny, taxonomy and zoogeography of the genus Gekko Laurenti, 1768 with the revalidation of G. reevesii Gray, 1831 (Sauria: Gekkonidae)". Zootaxa 2989: 1–50. (Gekko reevesii revalidated at specific rank).

Gekko
Reptiles of China
Reptiles of Vietnam
Reptiles described in 1831
Taxa named by John Edward Gray